Installation Sonore (English: Sound Installation) is the second studio album by French electronic rock band, Rinôçérôse. The album was released on 6 September 1999 through V2 Records.

Track listing

Appearances in other media 

"La Guitaristic House Organization" gained exposure as a sample song with Windows XP to show off Windows Media Player. The song was also featured in the EA Sports video game, NHL 2000.

References

1999 albums
Rinôçérôse albums
V2 Records albums
Instrumental albums
Instrumental rock albums